The Nyíregyháza Zoo (Nyíregyházi Állatpark – Animal Park of Nyíregyháza, also known as Sóstó Zoo) is a 30-hectare animal park zoo located 5 km (3.3 miles) north of Nyíregyháza, Hungary. The zoo is in the Sóstó recreation area, which includes a beach, spa, public swimming pool, open-air museum, and a forested oak tree park.

Visitors can observe how the wild zoo animals live across all the world's continents by touring the animal park. The zoo also provides visitors local access to Hotel Dzsungel (Hotel Jungle).

History
Nyíregyháza Zoo was opened in 1974 as “Nyíregyházi Vadaspark” (Wild Park of Nyíregyháza). It was located 5 kilometers from Nyíregyháza in the Sóstó recreation area of Hungary. Owned and sponsored by the local government, Nyíregyháza Zoo is governed by the city area of Sóstó-Nyíregyháza.

Upon first opening for visitors in 1974, its main purpose was to exhibit native species of Hungary and the Pannonian Basin. It has a unique exhibition system in which the giant exhibits are separated from the paths with ditches filled with water. Some European species were replaced with their close relatives; for instance, there are American bison exhibited instead of those found in Europe. The greatest spectacles of that time were the European carnivores, the bears, and the timber wolves substituting their European relatives. Despite this, the number of visitors decreased due to the lack of exotic animals.

The year 1996 brought a breakthrough to the zoo. This year, the new director László Gajdos took up his duties in the park and decided to create a real zoo in Nyíregyháza. János Szánthó received the rank of deputy manager. Szánthó personally brought up a number of smaller animals.

This year, the redenomination of the zoo has occurred. It received a new name “Nyíregyházi Állatpark” (however, some may still call it by its older name, Vadaspark, incorrectly). László Gajdos and his team have since come up with new ideas every year. The Állatpark is the richest zoo in mammals (especially primates and pachyderms) in Hungary. The once 14-hectare area is now 32 hectares large and home to 500 species and over 5000 animals that can be seen by the visitors. It has grown out to be the biggest animal collection in the country. The zoo is a member of the Hungarian Association of Zoos (MÁSZ), the European Association of Zoos and Aquaria (EAZA), and the World Association of Zoos and Aquariums (WAZA).

A short summary of what has happened since 1996:
1996: 1996 was the year of African species. The exhibit of lions was finished and the biggest exhibit in the country was opened under the name Afrika Panoráma (Africa Panorama), where zebras, ostriches, common elands, and wildebeests have cohabited. The aviary was also completed this year, which gives place to the richest parrot and cockatoo collection in Hungary. The exhibit for the tiger also opened this year.
1997: The expansion of the zoo was continued. The llama and the kangaroo exhibit opened for the public and the constructions of the giraffe shelter finished. The giraffe couple coming from the zoo of Emmen of the Netherlands gave birth to a baby in the same year.
1998: More and more species are given a place in the zoo, some of them are a real curiosity. Uniquely in Hungary, the parrots lay eggs throughout the year, and a number of scarce antelope calves are given birth (including waterbucks and black wildebeests). New species arrived at the zoo, the most interesting of which include skunks and red kangaroos coming from Budapest.
1999: The zoo became the first provincial zoo to provide a seal exhibit, where the visitors can inspect the swimming of calves as well. The construction of the rhinoceros shelter started this year too.
2000: The first saltwater aquarium in the countryside opened in 2000 in Hungary. Its most important animal among many others is a requiem shark.
2001: The exhibit and aviary for European animals was rebuilt and was denominated as Magyar Őspark (Hungarian Primeval Park). Besides the animals, a little open-air museum was given a place. The most interesting novelty is the long-desired European bison.
2002: The opening of the Tropical House occurred. A portion of sharks and monkeys were moved to the newly built house, of course the collection was completed with new species. The most precious inhabitants of the building are the Bornean orangutans. The open-air portion of the house was also opened in the same year which gives place to the Monkey Forest and the Mediterranean Garden.
2003: Around the former seal exhibit, Polar panorama was built. Penguins and polar bears are exhibited for the first time in provincial Hungary.
2004: The educational hall is built, which has since been closed. The wax museum presenting the evolution of humankind also opened that year. The sensation of the year is the arrival of the white tiger.
2005: Finally the first pachyderm, a young male white rhinoceros arrived. The Siberian tigers and the Kamchatka brown bears got a larger exhibit.
2006: The year of pachyderms. The new lion exhibit was built and the pygmy hippopotamus and elephant houses were finished. Two white rhinoceros and one pygmy hippo cows arrived along with three African elephants and two Indian rhinos. The construction of Hungary's first in-zoo hotel, Hotel Dzsungel (Hotel Jungle) also finished in the same year.
2007: An exhibit was built for the zoo's California sea lions. The birth of the first Hungarian-born African elephant calf, named Jumanee, occurred this year.
2008: The South America House (Dél-Amerika Ház) opened to the public. Its most well-known inhabitant is Pedro, the tapir. In addition, dromedaries, moose, and Grévy's zebras were introduced.
2009: New spectacled and sun bears arrived together with three Indian elephants and the white lion. The construction of a great project started in 2009. The Green Pyramid (Zöld Piramis) now introduces visitors to the mysterious world of Asia. As another part of the same project, Tarzan's path was opened which provides its visitors with an African adventure. The construction of the Indonesian Ocenarium and Rainforest House began in 2009 too.
2010: The whole project of the year 2009 opened for the public in 2010. Komodo dragons, pufferfish, triggerfish, a number of sharks (reef sharks, grey nurse sharks also known as sand tiger sharks), a 6 party orangutan family and a siamang arrived. Marmosets (now there are 18), the first Cameroon goat kids, a dromedary, and tortoises were given birth during the year.

References

External links 
  Sóstó Zoo
 

Zoos in Hungary
Buildings and structures in Szabolcs-Szatmár-Bereg County
Tourist attractions in Szabolcs-Szatmár-Bereg County
Zoos established in 1974
Articles needing infobox zoo
Nyíregyháza